Bishakh-Kanish are a music directing duo of Bishakh Jyoti and Kanish Sharma who works for Hindi films. Their first Bollywood movie Babloo Happy Hai directed by Nila Madhab Panda released on 7 feb, 2014.

Discography

As music directors

Background score
 Babloo Happy Hai (2014)

References

Sources
https://web.archive.org/web/20140204032019/http://www.statetimes.in/news/bishakh-kanish-youngest-music-director-duo/
https://web.archive.org/web/20140202222140/http://www.stateobserver.com/newsdet.aspx?q=42345
http://www.bollywoodhungama.com/celebritymicro/films/id/4334613
http://epaper.earlytimes.in/archive.aspx?page=8&date1=02/01/2014
https://web.archive.org/web/20160304105824/http://epaper.theshadow.in/archive.aspx?page=8&date1=01%2F30%2F2014
http://epaper.jammuexpress.com/archive.aspx?page=12&date1=01/31/2014

External links 

 
 https://www.facebook.com/BishakhKanish
 http://www.timesmusic.com/album/bollywood-film/babloo-happy-hai-2629.html
 http://gaana.com/album/babloo-happy-hai-hindi

Hindi music